Krystian Walery Łuczak (born 20 November 1949 in Inowrocław) is a Polish politician. He was elected to the Sejm on 25 September 2005, getting 5,824 votes in 5 Toruń district as a candidate from Democratic Left Alliance list.

He was also a member of Sejm 2001-2005.

See also
Members of Polish Sejm 2005-2007

External links
Krystian Łuczak - parliamentary page - includes declarations of interest, voting record, and transcripts of speeches.

1949 births
Living people
Democratic Left Alliance politicians
People from Inowrocław
Members of the Polish Sejm 2001–2005
Members of the Polish Sejm 2005–2007